The Welsh Sports and Saloon Car Championship is organised by the BARC and the Welsh Racing Drivers’ Association, the main venue of the championship being Pembrey. 2009 sees the championship travelling to Brands Hatch. The championship has also raced at Ty Croes in Anglesey, Donington Park, Mallory Park, Silverstone, Mondello Park, Lydden Hill, Thruxton and Oulton Park.

Class structure

The championship was first awarded in 1991 and has been contested every season since then. The class structure is modified for 2008 as follows: Class A, for road based saloon and sports cars up to 1600cc. Class B is contested by modified, road based saloon and sports cars with engines of up to 2000cc. Class C follows the same rules as Class B, except that it requires engine sizes to be above 2000cc. Finally Class D is for cars conforming to Touring car racing regulations and re-engined sports cars, such as Caterhams. Points are awarded depending on where the driver finishes in their class (in essence, there are four race winners), with the overall championship being awarded to the driver who has managed to accumulate the most class points, regardless of their overall results in the races.

Champions

External links 
 2006 Welsh Sports and Saloon Car Championship

Sports car racing series
Auto racing series in the United Kingdom
Motorsport in Wales